Leo Binz (October 31, 1900 – October 9, 1979) was an American prelate of the Catholic Church. He served as Archbishop of Dubuque (1954–1961) and as Archbishop of St. Paul and Minneapolis (1962–1975). A native of Illinois, he became a priest in 1924 and a bishop in 1942.

Early life and education
Leo Binz was born in Stockton, Illinois, the third child of Michael and Thecla (née Reible) Binz. The family lived on a small farm near the Mississippi River, east of Dubuque, Iowa. Following his confirmation, a young Binz declared to Bishop Peter Muldoon, "I'm going to be a bishop!" In 1914, he enrolled at Loras College in Dubuque, where he began his preparatory studies for the priesthood. He transferred to St. Mary's Seminary in Baltimore, Maryland, in 1918, and there earned a Bachelor of Arts degree (1919) and a Master of Arts degree (1920).

From 1920 to 1921, Binz studied at the Sulpician Seminary in Washington, D.C. He was then sent to continue his studies at the Pontifical North American College in Rome. He earned a Doctor of Sacred Theology degree from the Propaganda University (1924) and a Doctor of Philosophy degree from the Pontifical Gregorian University (1926).

Priesthood
On March 15, 1924, Binz was ordained a priest for the Diocese of Rockford at the Basilica of St. John Lateran. From 1924 to 1926, while pursuing his doctoral studies, he taught at the North American College. He then returned to Illinois, where his first assignment was as a curate at St. Mary's Church in Sterling. He was appointed secretary to Bishop Edward Francis Hoban in 1928, and served as chancellor of the diocese from 1929 to 1932. He then served as a pastor in Cherry Valley, Rockford, and Belvidere.

Binz was named a papal chamberlain in 1934, and raised to the rank of domestic prelate in 1939. From 1936 to 1942, he served as secretary to Archbishop Amleto Giovanni Cicognani, the Apostolic Delegate to the United States.

Episcopacy

Winona
On November 21, 1942, Binz was appointed titular bishop of Pinara and coadjutor bishop of the Diocese of Winona, Minnesota, by Pope Pius XII. He received his episcopal consecration on the following December 21 from Archbishop Amleto Cicognani, with Bishops Henry Rohlman and Edward Hoban serving as co-consecrators, at St. James Pro-Cathedral in Rockford. As coadjutor bishop, he served as apostolic administrator of the diocese under Bishop Francis Martin Kelly, who was in poor health. He also established Immaculate Heart of Mary Seminary, centralized all the offices of the diocese, and started the plans for building the first cathedral in Winona.

Dubuque
On October 15, 1949, Binz was appointed Titular Archbishop of Silyum and Coadjutor Archbishop of the Archdiocese of Dubuque. Upon the resignation of Archbishop Henry Rohlman, Binz succeeded him as the sixth Archbishop of Dubuque on December 2, 1954.

During his seven years as archbishop, he distinguished himself particularly in his commitment to Catholic education. He helped develop Catholic high schools in the archdiocese, served as president of the National Catholic Educational Association from 1954 to 1955, and headed the youth department of the National Catholic Welfare Council. He also established the North American Martyrs Retreat House in Cedar Falls, and expanded Catholic Charities in the archdiocese.

Saint Paul and Minneapolis
On December 16, 1961 Pope John XXIII named Binz the seventh bishop and fifth archbishop of Saint Paul.  He was installed on April 28, 1962.

From 1962 to 1965 Binz attended all four sessions of the Second Vatican Council, and faithfully implemented the reforms promulgated by the council in the archdiocese. He was known for his pastoral approach to leadership.  He promoted active lay participation and Christian renewal in the Church through fraternal societies.  He strengthened Catholic Charities, and he continued the annual May Day rosary processions.

Binz was named to the Pontifical Commission on Birth Control and was one of only seven members of the 72 member commission to vote that artificial birth control was intrinsically evil.

On July 11, 1966 the Holy See altered the name of the archdiocese to reflect the equal stature of the Twin Cities by naming the Basilica of Saint Mary in Minneapolis as co-cathedral of the archdiocese and adding Minneapolis to the title of the archdiocese. Subsequently, Binz was the first archbishop to hold the title of Archbishop of Saint Paul and Minneapolis.

As his health began to decline, Binz requested and received a coadjutor. Pope Paul VI named the Coadjutor Bishop of Wichita Leo Christopher Byrne coadjutor archbishop on July 31, 1967.  Binz allowed Archbishop Byrne to take greater control of the administration of the archdiocese. Byrne, however, died on October 21, 1974.

Pope Paul VI accepted Archbishop Binz's resignation on May 25, 1975.  He died four years later on October 9, 1979, in Maywood, Illinois.  Archbishop Binz was buried with other archbishops of the archdiocese at Resurrection Cemetery in Mendota Heights, Minnesota.

Notes

External links
 Archbishop Binz's Grave

1900 births
1979 deaths
People from Jo Daviess County, Illinois
People from Winona County, Minnesota
20th-century Roman Catholic archbishops in the United States
Participants in the Second Vatican Council
Roman Catholic Diocese of Rockford
Roman Catholic archbishops of Dubuque
Roman Catholic archbishops of Saint Paul
Roman Catholic archbishops of Saint Paul and Minneapolis
Burials in Minnesota
Religious leaders from Illinois
Catholics from Illinois